The article is a list of heads of state of Lithuania over historical Lithuanian state. The timeline includes all heads of state of Lithuania as a sovereign entity, legitimately part of a greater sovereign entity, a client state, or a constituent republic subject to an outside authority. Currently, the head of state is the President of Lithuania.

The Lithuanian monarchs were being inaugurated in the Vilnius Cathedral until 1569 by placing the Gediminas' Cap on their heads.

Kingdom of Lithuania (1251–1263) 
Title: King of Lithuania. Dates are approximate because of scant written sources.

House of Mindaugas (1253–1263)

|King 1236–1253  (as Grand Duke)   1253–1263 (as King)||  || Son of mythological Ringaudas || NN, sister of Morta  2 children  Morta  2 children || 1263  Aglona  Assassinated by Treniota  and Daumantas  Aged about 60
|-
|}

Grand Duchy of Lithuania (1263–1569) 

Title: Grand Duke. Dates are approximate because of scant written sources.

House of Mindaugas (1263–1267)

|Grand Duke 1263–1264||  || Unknown Son of NN,  Mindaugas' sister  and Vykintas || Unknown  1 child || 1264  Murdered by servants  loyal to Mindaugas' son Vaišvilkas
|-
|Grand Duke 1264–1267||  || Unknown Son of Mindaugasand Morta || Unmarried and  childless||  1268  Was murdered  by Leo I of Galicia
|-
|}

House of Monomakh (1267–1269)

|Grand Duke 1267–1269|| ||   Halych Son of Daniel of Galicia  || NN, daughter of Mindaugas  No children ||   Kholm  Aged about 39
|-
|}

House of Mindaugas (1269–1285)

|Grand Duke 1270–1282|||| 1220 || Ona of Masovia  1 child|| 1282  Kernavė  Aged 62
|-
|Grand Duke 1282–1285|| || Unknown ||Unknown || 3 March 1285  Died in a battle by Tver
|-
|}

House of Gediminas (1285–1440)

|Grand Duke 1285–1291|| || None known || Unknown  Son of  Skalmantas (?) || Unknown ||1291
|-
|Grand Duke 1291–1295|| || None known || Unknown  Son of  Skalmantas (?) || Unknown || 
|-
|Grand Duke 1295–1316|||| None known || 1260 Son of Butvydas || Vikinda  1 child|| 1316  Aged 56
|- 
|Grand Duke 1316–1341|||| None known ||  Son of Butvydas || Jaunė 13 children ||   Raudonė  Aged about 66
|-
|Grand Duke 1341–1345|||| None known ||  Son of Gediminasand Jaunė|| Unknown  3 children ||   Aged 57−60
|-
|Grand Duke   (Diarchy with Kęstutis)   1345–1377 ||||  ||  Son of Gediminasand Jaunė||  Maria of Vitebsk  6 children   Uliana of Tver  8 children||   Maišiagala  Aged about 81
|-
|Grand Duke   (Diarchy with Kęstutis)  May 1377–August 1381||||  ||   Vilnius Son of Algirdasand Uliana of Tver ||  Jadwiga of Poland  No children   Anna of Cilli  1 child   Elizabeth Granowska  No children   Sophia of Halshany  2 children || 1 June 1434  Gródek Jagielloński  Aged 72−82
|-
|Grand Duke  1381–1382 ||  ||  ||   Senieji Trakai Son of Gediminasand Jaunė|| Birutė  3 children|| 1382  Kreva  Murdered by the order of  Jogaila while imprisoned  Aged 84–85
|-
|Grand Duke  3 August 1382–1 June 1434||||  ||   Vilnius Son of Algirdasand Uliana of Tver ||  Jadwiga of Poland  No children   Anna of Cilli  1 child   Elizabeth Granowska  No children   Sophia of Halshany  2 children || 1 June 1434  Gródek Jagielloński  Aged 72−82
|-
|-
! colspan="6" |Act of Kreva signed in 1385<small>Poland and Lithuania de jure are ruled by one monarch but remain to be separate states.
|-
|King of Poland and Grand Duke  3 August 1382–1 June 1434||||  ||   Vilnius Son of Algirdasand Uliana of Tver ||  Jadwiga of Poland  No children   Anna of Cilli  1 child   Elizabeth Granowska  No children   Sophia of Halshany  2 children || 1 June 1434  Gródek Jagielloński  Aged 72−82
|-
|-
|Grand Duke  1386–1392 |||| ||   Vilnius Son of Algirdasand Uliana of Tver || Unmarried  and childless || 11 January 1397  Kyiv  Possibly poisoned  by the order of the  Russian Orthodox priests  Aged 43−44
|-
|-
! colspan="6" |Astrava Agreement signed in 1392<small>Following the Lithuanian Civil War, Skirgaila is replaced by Vytautas. The latter and his successors de jure act as regents of the King of Poland until 1440.
|-
|Grand DukeKing-elect of LithuaniaVytautas the Great4 August 1392–27 October 1430||||  ||   Senieji Trakai Son of Kęstutisand Birutė ||  Anna  1 child   Uliana Olshanska  No children || 27 October 1430  Trakai  Aged about 80
|-
|Grand Duke October 1430–1 August 1432||||  || Before 1370  Vilnius Son of Algirdasand Uliana of Tver || Anna of Tver  1 child || 10 February 1452  Lutsk  Aged about 82
|-
|Grand Duke 1432–1440 ||||  || 1365  Trakai Son of Kęstutisand Birutė|| Unknown 1 child|| 20 March 1440  Trakai  Murdered by supporters  of Švitrigaila  Aged 75
|-
|}

House of Jagiellon (1440–1569)
The act of personal union with Poland was signed as early as 1385; however, the continuous line of common rulers of the two countries started only with Casimir IV (even then, Polish and Lithuanians twice selected different rulers following the death of an earlier common monarch, but the Lithuanian one always eventually assumed the Polish throne). The monarchs retained separate titles for both parts of the state, and their numbering was kept separate. The Jagiellon dynasty was a direct continuation of the Gediminids.
|King of Poland and Grand Duke   29 June 1440–7 June 1492||||  || 30 November 1427  Kraków Son of Jogaila Algirdaitisand Sophia of Halshany || Elisabeth of Austria  12 children || 7 June 1492  Old Grodno Castle  Aged 64
|- 1263 –  1265||||||  ||
|King of Poland and Grand Duke   30 July 1492–19 August 1506||||  || 5 August 1461  Kraków Son of Kazimieras Jogailaitis and Elisabeth of Austria || Helena of Moscow  No children|| 19 August 1506  Vilnius  Aged 45
|- 1263 –  1265||||||  ||
|King of Poland and Grand Duke Sigismund I the Old 8 December 1506–1 April 1548||||  || 1 January 1467  Kozienice Son of Kazimieras Jogailaitis and Elisabeth of Austria  ||  Barbara Zápolya  2 children   Bona Sforza  6 children|| 1 April 1548  Kraków  Aged 81
|- 1263 –  1265||||||  ||
|King of Poland and Grand Duke  1 April 1548–7 July 1572 ||||  || 1 August 1520  Kraków Son of Žygimantas the Oldand Bona Sforza ||  Elisabeth of Austria  No children   Barbara Radziwiłł  No children   Catherine of Austria  No children|| 7 July 1572  Knyszyn  Aged 51
|-
! colspan="6" |Union of Lublin signed in 1569<small>Poland and Lithuania are united into a single Commonwealth. 
|- 1263 –  1265||||||  ||
|}

Polish–Lithuanian Commonwealth (1569–1795)

The Polish–Lithuanian Commonwealth was established by the Union of Lublin in 1569. The elected King of Poland was automatically a Grand Duke of Lithuania (until then the Lithuanian dukedom was hereditary). The first common ruler of both countries was Sigismund II Augustus. 

During the Deluge of the Second Northern War, Lithuania signed the Union of Kėdainiai with the Swedish Empire in 1655, thus de jure ending its union with Poland. However, due to Sweden's losses, the agreement soon fell out of favor and was not properly enforced, leading to the further continuation of the Polish–Lithuanian Commonwealth. Following the partitions in 1772, 1793, and 1795, the commonwealth ceased to exist and Lithuania proper became part of the Russian Empire for 123 years. There are some gaps in the timeline as it took a while to elect a new king. The first Grand Duke elected after the Gediminid line became extinct and after the Valois fled back to France was Stephen Báthory, who had made an effort to be recognized as Grand Duke of Lithuania by establishing Vilnius University.

Title: King of Poland and Grand Duke of Lithuania

|-
|King of Poland and Grand Duke Sigismund II Augustus1 July 15697 July 1572()
| 
| 
| 1 August 1520KrakówSon of Žygimantas the Oldand Bona Sforza
|  Elisabeth of Austria  Barbara Radziwiłł  Catherine of Austria
| 7 July 1572KnyszynAged 51
| Heredetary First monarch to  introduce elective  monarchy 
| Jagiellon

|-
|King of Poland and Grand Duke Henry16 May 157312 May 1575()
| 
| 
| 19 September 1551FontainebleauSon of Henry II and Catherine de' Medici
|  Louise of Lorraine, no children
| 2 August 1589Saint-CloudAged 37
| ElectedLeft Poland in June 1574 to succeed his brother in FranceInterregnum until 1575
| Valois

|-
|Queen of Poland and Grand Dutchess Anna15 December 157519 August 1587 (de facto) 9 September 1596 (de jure) 
| 
| 
| 18 October 1523KrakówDaughter of Sigismund I and Bona Sforza
|  Stephen Báthory, no children
| 9 September 1596WarsawAged 72
| Elected co-monarch with Stephen BáthorySole ruler until Báthory's arrival and coronation in May 1576Ruled after husband's death until her nephew was elected 
| Jagiellon

|-
|King of Poland and Grand Duke Stephen Báthory1 May 157612 December 1586()
| 
| 
| 27 September 1533Szilágysomlyó (Șimleu Silvaniei)Son of Stephen Báthory of Somlyó and Catherine Telegdi
|  Anna Jagiellon, no children
| 12 December 1586GrodnoAged 53
| Elected as co-monarch with Anna JagiellonPreviously Prince of Transylvania
| Báthory

|-
|King of Poland and Grand Duke Sigismund III19 August 158730 April 1632()
| 
| 
| 20 June 1566GripsholmSon of John III of Sweden and Catherine Jagiellon
|  Anne of Austria Constance of Austria
| 30 April 1632WarsawAged 65
| Elected, nephew of Anna JagiellonTransferred capital from Kraków to WarsawHereditary King of Sweden until deposition in 1599
| Vasa

|-
|King of Poland and Grand Duke Władysław IValso Ladislaus IV8 November 163220 May 1648()
| 
| 
| 9 June 1595ŁobzówSon of Sigismund III and Anne of Austria
|  Cecilia Renata of Austria Marie Louise Gonzaga
| 20 May 1648MerkinėAged 52
| Elective successionAlso titular King of Sweden and elected Tsar of Russia (1610–1613) when the Polish army captured Moscow
| Vasa

|-
|King of Poland and Grand Duke John II Casimir20 November 164816 September 1668()
| 
| 
| 22 March 1609KrakówSon of Sigismund III and Constance of Austria
|  Marie Louise Gonzaga Claudine Françoise Mignot (morganatic marriage)
| 16 December 1672NeversAged 63
| Elective succession, succeeded half-brotherPreviously a cardinalTitular King of SwedenAbdicated
| Vasa

|-
|King of Poland and Grand Duke Michael I19 June 166910 November 1673()
| 
| 
| 31 May 1640Biały KamieńSon of Jeremi Wiśniowiecki and Gryzelda Konstancja Zamoyska
|  Eleonora Maria of Austria, no children
| 10 November 1673LwówAged 33
| ElectedBorn into nobility of mixed heritage, the son of a military commander and governor
| Wiśniowiecki

|-
|King of Poland and Grand Duke John III Sobieski19 May 167417 June 1696()
| 
| 
| 17 August 1629OleskoSon of Jakub Sobieski and Teofila Zofia
|  Marie Casimire d'Arquien, 13 children
| 17 June 1696WilanówAged 66
| ElectedBorn into nobilityA successful military commander
| Sobieski

|-
|King of Poland and Grand Duke Augustus II15 September 16971706(1st reign, 9 years)
| 
| 
| 12 May 1670DresdenSon of John George III and Princess Anna Sophie of Denmark
|  Christiane Eberhardine of Brandenburg-Bayreuth, 1 son by wife
| 1 February 1733WarsawAged 62
| ElectedPreviously Elector and ruler of SaxonyDethroned by Stanislaus I in 1706 during the Great Northern War
| Wettin

|-
|King of Poland and Grand Duke Stanislaus I12 July 17048 July 1709(1st reign)
| 
| 
| 20 October 1677LwówSon of Rafał Leszczyński and Anna Jabłonowska
|  Catherine Opalińska, 2 children
| 23 February 1766LunévilleAged 88
| UsurpedNominated as ruler in 1704, crowned in 1705 and deposed predecessor in 1706Exiled in 1709
| Leszczyński

|-
|King of Poland and Grand Duke Augustus II8 July 17091 February 1733(2nd reign)
| 
| 
| 12 May 1670DresdenSon of John George III and Princess Anna Sophie of Denmark
|  Christiane Eberhardine of Brandenburg-Bayreuth, 1 son by wife
| 1 February 1733WarsawAged 62
| Restored
| Wettin

|-
|King of Poland and Grand Duke Stanislaus I12 September 173326 January 1736(2nd reign)
| 
| 
| 20 October 1677LwówSon of Rafał Leszczyński and Anna Jabłonowska
|  Catherine Opalińska, 2 children
| 23 February 1766LunévilleAged 88
| ElectedHis election sparked the War of the Polish SuccessionDeposed by Augustus III in 1736
| Leszczyński

|-
|King of Poland and Grand Duke Augustus III5 October 17335 October 1763(30 years)
| 
| 
| 17 October 1696DresdenSon of Augustus II the Strong and Christiane Eberhardine
|  Maria Josepha of Austria, 16 children
| 5 October 1763DresdenAged 66
| UsurpedProclaimed King of Poland in 1733, crowned in 1734Dethroned elected predecessor in 1736
| Wettin

|-
|King of Poland and Grand Duke Stanislaus II Augustus7 September 176425 November 1795()
| 
| 
| 17 January 1732WołczynSon of Stanisław Poniatowski and Konstancja Czartoryska
| Unmarried
| 1 February 1798Saint PetersburgAged 66
| ElectedBorn into nobilityLast King of Poland and Grand Duke of Lithuania, his reign ended in the Partitions of Poland
| Poniatowski
|}

Kingdom of Lithuania (1918)

The Council of Lithuania declared independence on 16 February 1918 and invited Wilhelm of Urach to become king of Lithuania. The name of the state was the Kingdom of Lithuania. On 9 July 1918, Duke Wilhelm accepted the offer and took the name Mindaugas II. However, on 2 November the council revoked this decision as it was likely Germany would lose the war.

House of Urach (1918)

|KingMindaugas II    – ||||  || 30 May 1864 Son of Wilhelm, 1st Duke of Urach and Princess Florestine of Monaco || Duchess Amalie in Bavaria  Princess Wiltrud of Bavaria || 24 March 1928 
|-
|}

Republic of Lithuania (1918–1940)

Presidents of the Presidium of the Council of Lithuania 
The state of Lithuania was ruled by the Presidium of the State Council of Lithuania, its chairman was de facto Head of State. The institution of President was established on 4 April 1919. Chairman of the Presidium Antanas Smetona was elected as First President of the State of Lithuania by the State Council of Lithuania and was the only one in under whose rule this position has been considered the office of the head of state.

Presidents of the Republic of Lithuania 
The institution of President was created on 4 April 1919. Antanas Smetona was elected as the first President of Lithuania.

Posthumously recognized acting Presidents

Lithuanian Soviet Socialist Republic (1940–1941) 

The Soviet Union occupied Lithuania and established the Lithuanian SSR in July 1940.

First Secretaries of the Central Committee of the Communist Party of Lithuania 
; .

Generalbezirk Litauen (1941–1944) 

As Nazi Germany attacked the Soviet Union in Operation Barbarossa, Lithuania liberated itself with the anti-Soviet June Uprising and re-declared Lithuanian Independence. Lithuania was ruled for some time by the Provisional Government of Lithuania, whose prime minister was Juozas Ambrazevičius. The Provisional Government was formed on 23 June 1941, but was dissolved on 5 August of the same year.

Lithuania was occupied by the Germans, who formed Generalbezirk Litauen on 25 July 1941, which was governed by the administration of general commissioner Adrian von Renteln and was a part of Reichskommissariat Ostland.

General Commissioners of Generalbezirk Litauen 
; .

Lithuanian Soviet Socialist Republic (1944–1990) 
As Nazi Germany retreated, the Soviet Union reoccupied the country and reestablished the Lithuanian SSR in 1944. The Presidium of the Supreme Soviet de jure acted as a collective head of state from 25 August 1940 to 11 March 1990. However, the Supreme Soviet de facto was controlled by the Communist Party of Lithuania led by the First Secretary.

First Secretaries of the Central Committee of the Communist Party of Lithuania

Republic of Lithuania (1990–present)
The leader of the Supreme Council was the official head of state from the declaration of independence on 11 March 1990 until the new Constitution came into effect in 1992 establishing the office of President and the institution of Seimas. The state and its leadership were not recognized internationally until September 1991 [NB: Iceland was the first country to recognise the regained independence of Lithuania in February 1991.Title from 1990 to 1992: Chairman of the Supreme Council (Parliament).
Title from 1992 onwards: President.

See also
List of Lithuanian monarchs
List of Lithuanian consorts
List of early Lithuanian dukes

References

History, Office of the President of the Republic of Lithuania. Retrieved 26 August 2006.
 Vytautas Spečiūnas (ed.), Lietuvos valdovai (XIII-XVIII a.) (Rulers of Lithuania (13–18th centuries)), Mokslo ir enicklopedijų leidybos institutas, Vilnius 2004.

External links
Another list of Lithuanian rulers

 
Rulers
Lithuanian
 
People of medieval Lithuania
Middle Ages-related lists